The Falkland Islands are an archipelago in the South Atlantic Ocean, located about  from the coast of mainland South America and  from mainland Antarctica. The archipelago, consisting of East Falkland, West Falkland and 776 lesser islands, is a self-governing Overseas Territory of the United Kingdom. The capital, Stanley, is on East Falkland. The islands contain two airports with paved runways, with settlements around the archipelago served by grass airstrips.



Airports

Other FIGAS airstrips
East Falklands:
 Bleaker Island
 Darwin/Goose Green
 Douglas Station
 George Island
 Lively Island
 North Arm
 Port San Carlos
 Salvador
 Sea Lion Island
 Speedwell Island

West Falklands:
 Albemarle
 Beaver Island
 Carcass Island
 Chartres
 Dunnose Head
 Fox Bay
 Hill Cove
 New Island
 Pebble Island
 Port Edgar
 Port Howard
 Port Stephens
 Roy Cove
 Saunders Island
 Shallow Harbour
 Spring Point
 Weddell Island
 West Point Island
Source: 

They are in general 500–700 metres (1,600–2,300 ft) long

See also 
 Transport in the Falkland Islands
 List of airports by ICAO code: S#SF - Falkland Islands (Islas Malvinas)
 List of airports in the United Kingdom and the British Crown Dependencies
 Wikipedia: WikiProject Aviation/Airline destination lists: South America#Falkland Islands (United Kingdom)

References 

 
  - includes IATA codes
 Great Circle Mapper: Airports in the Falkland Islands - IATA and ICAO airport codes
 OurAirports: Airports in the Falkland Islands - lists 13 Falkland Island airports

Footnotes

 
Airports
Falkland Islands
Falkland Islands